Ice discs, ice circles, ice pans, ice pancakes or ice crepes are a very rare natural phenomenon that occurs in slow moving water in cold climates. They are thin circular slabs of ice that rotate slowly on a body of water's surface.

Types

Ice discs
Ice discs form on the outer bends in a river where the accelerating water creates a force called 'rotational shear', which breaks off a chunk of ice and twists it around. As the disc rotates, it grinds against surrounding ice — smoothing into a circle. A relatively uncommon phenomenon, one of the earliest recordings is of a slowly revolving disc spotted on the Mianus River and reported in an 1895 edition of Scientific American.

Ice pans
River specialist and geography professor Joe Desloges states that ice pans are "surface slabs of ice that form in the center of a lake or creek, instead of along the water’s edge". As water cools, ice crystals form into 'frazil ice' and can cluster together into a pan-shaped formation. If an ice pan accumulates enough frazil ice and the current remains slow, the pan may transform into a 'hanging dam', a heavy block of ice with high ridges and a low centre.

Formation

Conditions
It is believed that ice circles form in eddy currents. It has been shown that existing ice discs can maintain their rotation due to melting.

Physics
Ice circles tend to rotate even when they form in water that is not moving. The ice circle lowers the temperature of the water around it, which causes the water to become denser than the slightly warmer water around it. The dense water then sinks and creates its own circular motion, causing the ice circle to rotate.

Size

Notable examples

Ice discs have most frequently been observed in Scandinavia and North America. An ice disc was observed in Wales in December 2008 and another one in England in January 2009. An ice disc was observed on the Sheyenne River in North Dakota in December 2013. In Idaho, extreme weather led to a rare sighting of an ice disc on the Snake River on 22 January 2014.

A smaller disc was reported by park rangers in Baxter State Park, in northern Maine, the same month. In January 2020, an ice disc appeared on the Kennebec River in Skowhegan, Maine, United States

It was estimated to be rotating at approximately 20–25 minutes per rotation.

Artificial ice circles

Artificial ice circles have also been created by cutting a large circle in a sheet of ice. These artificial creations are called "ice carousels". Record setting ice carousels are recorded by the World Ice Carousel Association.

See also

References

Further reading
Theories abound on how the river got those patterns – MIT News

External links

Video of ice disc in Germany: 
Video of ice disc in Ontario, Canada: 

Bodies of ice
Water ice
River morphology
Vortices
Circles